Benjamin Gföhler (born 27 January 1994) is a Swiss athlete specialising in the long jump. He finished fourth at the 2015 European U23 Championships. Before concentrating on the long jump he competed in the combined events.

His personal bests in the long jump are 8.13 metres outdoors (+1.0 m/s, Oberteuringen 2016) and 7.94 metres indoors (Magglingen 2018).

International competitions

References

1994 births
Living people
Swiss male long jumpers
Swiss decathletes
Competitors at the 2019 Summer Universiade